Qardaşkənd (also, Kardashkend) is a village and municipality in the Sabirabad Rayon of Azerbaijan.  It has a population of 310.

References 

Populated places in Sabirabad District